2016 in philosophy

Events
Edward N. Zalta is awarded the 2016 Barwise Prize.
Charles Taylor wins the inaugural million-dollar Berggruen Prize for Philosophy, awarded to "a thinker whose ideas are of broad significance for shaping human self-understanding and the advancement of humanity," in a ceremony at the New York Public Library.
Victor Caston, Anjan Chakravartty, Daniel Garber, and Richard Kraut are awarded Guggenheim Fellowships in philosophy.
Christian Teichmann is presented a Hannah Arendt Award.
Brian Skyrms receives the Hempel Award.
Patrick Haggard is awarded the 2016 Jean Nicod Prize.
Martha Nussbaum is awarded the Kyoto Prize in Arts and Philosophy.
Brian Epstein is awarded the Lakatos Award.
Victoria Pitts-Taylor receives the PSA Women's Caucus Prize in Feminist Philosophy of Science.
Jonathan Sacks is awarded the Templeton Prize.
Jan Sokol is awarded The VIZE 97 Prize.

Publications
The following list is arranged alphabetically:

Louis Althusser (Author), Étienne Balibar (Introduction & Contributor), Roger Establet (Contributor), Jacques Rancière (Contributor), Pierre Macherey (Contributor) – Reading Capital: The Complete Edition
 Jacques Derrida – Heidegger: The Question of Being and History
 Peter Singer, One World Now: The Ethics of Globalization (Yale University Press)
 Peter Sloterdijk, Foams:  Spheres Volume III:  Plural Spherology (2016)

Deaths
Birth years link to the corresponding "[year] in philosophy" article:
 January 14 – Ellen Meiksins Wood, 73 (born 1942), American-born historian and political theorist.
 February 19 – Umberto Eco, 84 (born 1932), Italian philosopher (Kant and the Platypus) and novelist (The Name of the Rose)
 March 13 – Hilary Putnam, 89 (born 1926), American philosopher, mathematician and computer scientist.

References

Philosophy
21st-century philosophy
Philosophy by year